Sibley County is a county in the South Central part of the U.S. state of Minnesota. As of the 2020 census, the population was 14,836. Its county seat is Gaylord. Sibley County was part of the Minneapolis-St. Paul-Bloomington, MN-WI Metropolitan Statistical Area from 2013 to September 2018.

History
The county was created on March 5, 1853. It was named for Henry Hastings Sibley.

The county seat was first established at Henderson. A courthouse was built there and placed into service in 1879. It was used in that capacity until 1915, when the county seat was moved to Gaylord (after Gaylord residents presented a petition to county supervisors). Now the Henderson Community Building, the original courthouse presently houses Henderson City offices.

Geography
The Minnesota River flows northeastward along Sibley County's eastern border. It is fed by the Rush River, whose three branches drain the lower part of the county before merging and then meeting the Minnesota below Henderson. Bevens Creek drains the upper part of the county, flowing northeastward into Carver County. The county terrain consists of rolling hills etched with drainages and dotted with lakes and ponds, with the area devoted to agriculture. The terrain slopes to the east and north, with its highest point near its northwest corner at 1,083' (330m) ASL. Most of the Rush River's watershed is in Sibley County.

Major highways

  U.S. Highway 169
  Minnesota State Highway 5
  Minnesota State Highway 15
  Minnesota State Highway 19
  Minnesota State Highway 22
  Minnesota State Highway 25
  Minnesota State Highway 93

Adjacent counties

 McLeod County - north
 Carver County - northeast
 Scott County - east
 Le Sueur County - southeast
 Nicollet County - south
 Renville County - west

Lakes

 Altnow Lake: in Dryden Township
 Beatty Lake: in Dryden Township
 Clear Lake: northern half is in Severance Township; southern half is in Nicollet County
 Curran Lake: in Green Isle Township
 Erin Lake
 Hahn Lake: in New Auburn Township
 High Island Lake: in New Auburn Township
 Indian Lake: in Transit Township
 Kerry Lake: in Faxon Township
 Kirby Lake
 Mud Lake: in Dryden Township
 Mud Lake: there is another Mud Lake in New Auburn Township northwest of Hahn Lake
 Mud Lake: there is a third Mud Lake in New Auburn Township southeast of Hahn Lake
 Mud Lake: there is a fourth Mud Lake in Severance Township
 Mud Lakes: three lakes in Washington Lake Township
 Round Grove Lake
 Sand Lake: western two thirds is in Cornish Township; the eastern third is in Alfsborg Township
 Schauer Lake: in Green Isle Township
 Schilling Lake: in New Auburn Township
 Severance Lake: in Green Isle Township
 Silver Lake: in Jessenland Township
 Swan Lake: in Severance Township
 Titlow Lake: in Dryden Township: the North Branch Rush River starts at this lake.
 Ward Lake (part)
 Washington Lake: in Washington Lake Township

Protected areas

 Altnow Marsh State Wildlife Management Area
 Indian Lake State Wildlife Management Area
 Minnesota Valley National Wildlife Refuge (part)
 Revanche Wildlife Management Area
 Rush River County Park

Demographics

2000 census
As of the 2000 census, there were 15,356 people, 5,772 households, and 4,086 families in the county. The population density was 26.1/sqmi (10.1/km2). There were 6,024 housing units at an average density of 10.2/sqmi (3.95/km2). The racial makeup of the county was 95.57% White, 0.12% Black or African American, 0.26% Native American, 0.33% Asian, 3.09% from other races, and 0.62% from two or more races. 5.43% of the population were Hispanic or Latino of any race. 65.7% were of German and 6.3% Norwegian ancestry.

There were 5,772 households, of which 33.6% had children under 18 living with them, 61.1% were married couples living together, 5.8% had a female householder with no husband present, and 29.2% were non-families. 25.4% of all households were made up of individuals, and 13.0% had someone living alone who was 65 or older. The average household size was 2.60 and the average family size was 3.14.

The county population was 27.7% under 18, 7.5% from 18 to 24, 27.1% from 25 to 44, 21.3% from 45 to 64, and 16.4% 65 or older. The median age was 37. For every 100 females there were 102.9 males. For every 100 females 18 and over, there were 99.9 males.

The median income for a household in the county was $41,458, and the median income for a family was $48,923. Males had a median income of $31,002 versus $22,527 for females. The per capita income was $18,004. About 5.1% of families and 8.1% of the population were below the poverty line, including 9.8% of those under 18 and 7.8% of those 65 or over.

2020 Census

Communities

Cities

 Arlington
 Gaylord (county seat)
 Gibbon
 Green Isle
 Henderson
 Le Sueur (mostly in Le Sueur County)
 New Auburn
 Winthrop

Unincorporated communities
 Assumption (partial)
 New Rome
 Rush River

Townships

 Alfsborg Township
 Arlington Township
 Bismarck Township
 Cornish Township
 Dryden Township
 Faxon Township
 Grafton Township
 Green Isle Township
 Henderson Township
 Jessenland Township
 Kelso Township
 Moltke Township
 New Auburn Township
 Severance Township
 Sibley Township
 Transit Township
 Washington Lake Township

Politics
During the Third Party System, Sibley was a strongly Democratic county due its German Catholic populace's opposition to the Republican Party's pietism. It voted Democratic in every presidential election until William Jennings Bryan’s Populist-backed free silver campaign drove its voters to William McKinley. Except when voting for Robert La Follette in 1924 and Franklin D. Roosevelt during his two 1930s landslides, Sibley County has been strongly Republican since 1896. It was one of only four Minnesota counties to vote for Barry Goldwater over Lyndon Johnson in 1964, and in no presidential election since 1936 has the Democratic nominee won a majority. In 1992, Sibley was Ross Perot’s strongest county in Minnesota, losing by only 14 votes to Bill Clinton, whose pluralities in this and the 1996 election are the only Democratic victories in Sibley County since 1940.

See also
 National Register of Historic Places listings in Sibley County, Minnesota

Notes

References

External links
 Sibley County government website

 
Minnesota counties
1853 establishments in Minnesota Territory
Populated places established in 1853